The Angels is the first album by Australian hard rock band, The Angels, which was released in August 1977. It was produced by Vanda & Young (The Easybeats) at Sydney's Albert Studios. It included a re-recorded version of their debut single, "Am I Ever Gonna See Your Face Again" (March 1976) and provided their second single, "You're a Lady Now", in July 1977. By the mid-1980s "Am I Ever Gonna See Your Face Again" had developed a cult status with the audience responding with "No way, get fucked, fuck off!"

Background
The Angels is the eponymous debut album by Australian hard rockers, The Angels, which was issued in August 1977. The group's line up, from January that year, were Chris Bailey on bass guitar; Graham Bidstrup (aka Buzz Throckman) on drums; John Brewster on rhythm guitar and backing vocals; his brother, Rick Brewster on lead guitar; and Bernard "Doc" Neeson on lead vocals.

The group had supported AC/DC in early 1976 and were signed by their producers, Vanda & Young, to Albert Productions record label. On 1 March that year The Angels had issued their debut single, "Am I Ever Gonna See Your Face Again", which was produced by Vanda & Young. The band then recorded their debut album at Albert Studio with Vanda & Young producing, again. Six of the ten tracks were co-written by the Brewster brothers with Neeson.

Ahead of the album's appearance they released their second single, "You're a Lady Now", in July 1977. The album followed in the next month in both LP and cassette formats. By the mid-1980s "Am I Ever Gonna See Your Face Again" had developed a cult status with audiences responding with "No way, get fucked, fuck off!". In February 1988 the group released a live version of the single, which included this chant, and marketed T-shirts sporting the phrase.

Reception

Track listing

Personnel 
The Angels members
 Doc Neeson – lead vocals
 Rick Brewster – lead guitar
 John Brewster – rhythm guitar, backing vocals
 Chris Bailey – bass guitar
 Buzz Throckman – drums

Production
 Producers – Vanda & Young
 Studios – Albert Studios, Sydney

References

External links 
 The Angels fan forum

1977 debut albums
Albums produced by Harry Vanda
Albums produced by George Young (rock musician)
The Angels (Australian band) albums
Albert Productions albums